Antonio Toselli (20 October 1884 – 2 June 1954) was an Italian engineer and politician, who served as Mayor of Cuneo from 1946 to 1948 and as Senator for two legislatures (1948–1953, 1953–1954).

References

1884 births
1954 deaths
Mayors of Cuneo
Senators of Legislature I of Italy
Senators of Legislature II of Italy
20th-century Italian politicians
Christian Democracy (Italy) politicians